The Canadians is a biographical television show that is broadcast by History Television. The show is hosted and narrated by Patrick Watson, featuring the stories of well-known and some not-so-well-known Canadians.

 List of People who were profiled on the show

William Aberhart (Bible Bill)
W.A.C. Bennett
Buzz Beurling
Birdman
Wilf Carter
Marion de Chastelain
Kit Coleman
Louis Cyr
Gabriel Dumont
Bob Edwards
Sir Sandford Fleming
Northrop Frye
Rose Fortune
Alfred C. Fuller
CD Howe
Sir Sam Hughes
Stewart James
Pauline Johnson
Klondike Kate
Ruby Keeler
La Bolduc
Anna Leonowens
Ruth Lowe
Grant MacEwan
Gunanoot
Alexander Mackenzie
Agnes Macphail
Mandrake
Louis B. Mayer
Ada McCallum
Bill Miner
Emily Murphy
Margaret "Ma" Murray
Northern Dancer
Marion Orr
Grey Owl
Mona Parsons
Jacques Plante
Francis Rattenbury
Fred Rose
Bobbie Rosenfeld
Joseph Scriven
Nell Shipman
Jay Silverheels
Joshua Slocum
Sam Steele
The Great Farini
The Megantic Outlaw
Tom Thomson
Joseph Tyrrell
Vladimir Valenta
Georges Vanier
Angus Walters
John Ware
Percy Williams

External links

1990s Canadian documentary television series
Television series by Alliance Atlantis